The Champion is an idol drama produced by Mediacorp in Singapore. It was telecast from October 20 to November 16, 2004. The show stars Toro, Yen Hsing-su, Qi Yuwu, Julian Hee, Jeanette Aw, Felicia Chin, Fiona Xie and Joyce Zhao, all young actors and actresses. This show also marked Jesseca Liu's acting debut. This series repeated on Tues-Sat at 12am, after succeeding Spice Siblings

It received one of the highest viewership rate during the telecast of the show, especially since there were a few semi-nude scenes such as Qi Yuwu stripping on-screen and Fiona Xie and other members of the Flying Fish running down Orchard Road in their bikinis.

This was also the first drama which allowed viewers to vote via a SMS competition on November 16, 2004 for the viewers' favourite 2-minute short ending which was aired on November 17, 2004 at 8.58 pm just before the debut of the next drama My Mighty In-Laws.

Plot 
The series mainly dealt with the trials and travails of a Singaporean swimming team, the Flying Fish (飞鱼队, which could be a reference to a classic Singaporean drama about an aspiring swimmer, Flying Fish), and its constituent members. The team is locked in a vicious competition with the Seagulls swimming team (海鸥队), whose superior swimming abilities bred an intense arrogance that shows everywhere within the swimming complex they practice in.

After the Flying Fish lost a bet with the Seagulls, which resulted in the Flying Fish team running down Orchard Road wearing only bikinis, the team's manager hired a new swimming coach to rescue the team from the brink of dissolution. The coach, Ivan Jackson (also known as Wu Zhenkang), was very strict about the rigorous training, and this drew massive opposition at first, and earned him the title of "Polar Bear" (cold, uncaring, and "foreign"). However, the team's performance eventually improved, thanks to the training.

Subplots 
The main subplot revolved around Guo Jingwen. Her constant tardiness earned her the dubious title of "Tardy Queen" (迟到Queen). The new coach, at first, kicked her off the team because of this, but what the coach did not know was Jingwen came from a dysfunctional and poor family, where the father works low-pay jobs to feed his two daughters and son. Jingwen's younger sister was paralyzed during a childhood illness, and uses a wheelchair for mobility.  Jingwen's brother is a rebellious teenager, whose antics with his hooligan friends have drawn the ire of his father. Meanwhile, Jingwen works as a swimming coach to bring extra income to the cash-strapped family. Once the coach learned about this, he relaxed his strict rules on timeliness for Jingwen. The close relationship Zhenkang had with Jingwen almost cost Zhenkang his wife. Later on, Lu Kaiwei falls for Jingwen, after being dumped by his girlfriend He Yixuan.

Another subplot, developed later on in the series, was between Lu Kaixin and He Yilin. They were both in love with Xie Jiajun, and this resulted in Yilin, who believed she was superior in all aspects to Kaixin, to lace Kaixin's water with steroids during a swimming competition. This cost Kaixin her gold medal, and put the team in jeopardy. Another contributing factor was the fact that Kaixin's older brother Kaiwei had broken up with Yilin's older sister Yixuan. Yilin later defected to the Seagulls to try to defeat Kaixin, but Kaixin defeated Yilin in a swimming duel, and Yilin was subsequently kicked off the Seagulls for the Steroid scandal, in addition to her poor attitude towards the coach of the team, and an incident where Yilin allegedly posted defamatory posters inside the Swimming Complex against the Flying Fish. Completely defeated (and disgraced by the Seagulls), Yilin gave up on her quest for superiority, and allowed Kaixin to have Jiajun. The Flying Fish members eventually forgave Yilin.

Cast

Awards & Nominations

See also 
Flying Fish: a 1983 Singapore Broadcasting Corporation TV series that also revolved around swimming and competition.
Splash to Victory, a 1989 Singapore Broadcasting Corporation series that revolved around two swimming sisters.

External links 
 
The Champion on Mediacorp

2004 Singaporean television series debuts
2004 Singaporean television series endings
Singapore Chinese dramas
Channel 8 (Singapore) original programming